"Trickle-down theory" can refer to two different but related concepts:
Trickle-down effect, a model of product adoption in marketing
Trickle-down economics, a theory for tax cuts on high incomes and business activity